Jack Williams (22 October 1907 – 11 July 1987) was an  Australian rules footballer who played with Fitzroy in the Victorian Football League (VFL).

Notes

External links 
		

1907 births
1987 deaths
Australian rules footballers from Victoria (Australia)
Fitzroy Football Club players
Mortlake Football Club players